The foil event for professionals involved 61 fencers from 7 nations. It was held from 22 to 29 May. The event as won by Lucien Mérignac, as France swept the top three places. Alphonse Kirchhoffer and Jean-Baptiste Mimiague were second and third, respectively.

Background

This was the second and final appearance of the event. Fencing masters were an exception to the amateurs-only nature of the early Olympics. Masters fencing was held as an Olympic event in 1896 (men's foil only) and 1900 (all three weapons for men, as well as a special event in épée that pitted the top professionals against the top amateurs). By 1904, only amateur events were conducted.

Competition format

The event used a five-round format (four main rounds and a repechage). For the first three rounds (round 1, quarterfinals, repechage) the round consisted of the fencers being paired and fighting a single bout; jury evaluations of skill rather than the match results were used to determine advancement. The last two rounds (semifinals and finals) used round-robin pool play with actual results counting toward placement. Standard foil rules were used, including that touches had to be made with the tip of the foil, the target area was limited to the torso, and priority determined the winner of double touches.

 Round 1: The 61 fencers paired off and faced a single opponent in one bout. The jury selected 45 fencers to advance to the quarterfinals.
 Quarterfinals: The 45 fencers were paired off again. The jury selected 10 fencers for the semifinals. All the rest went to the repchage.
 Repechage: The 35 fencers were paired. The jury selected 6 of them to advance.
 Semifinals: The 16 fencers from the quarterfinals and repechage were divided into two pools of 8 fencers each. Each pool played a round robin. The top four fencers in each semifinal pool advanced to the final, while the bottom four fencers went to a classification 9–16 final.
 Finals: There was a main final (top 4 from each semifinal) and a classification 9–16 final (bottom 4 from each semifinal). Each was conducted as a round-robin.

Schedule

Results

Round 1

Held on 22 May and 23 May, the masters foil used jury verdicts on art and skill in the bout rather than winning or losing to advance to the second round.

Quarterfinals

The second round also used jury verdicts to determine advancement from the second round, held on 24 May. The top 10 fencers received automatic qualification to the semifinals while the rest competed in a repechage.

Repechage

The repechage on 25 May was also conducted by jury selection following bouts. 6 fencers advanced to the semifinals.

Semifinals

The 16 remaining fencers were divided into two pools of 8. They competed in round-robin tournaments on 27 May and 28 May, with the top four in each pool advancing to the final. The others played in the consolation pool.

Semifinal A

Semifinal B

Finals

Classification 9–16

The consolation pool was held on 29 May. The bottom four fencers from each of the semifinals competed for 9th through 16th places.

Final

The final was conducted on 29 May. The format was a round-robin among the top 8 fencers. Ties were broken by an extra bout (ignoring the head-to-head results of the fencers during the round-robin).

Notes

Fencing at the 1900 Summer Olympics